The 2018–19 WHL season is the 53rd season of the Western Hockey League (WHL). The regular season began on September 21, 2018, and ended on March 17, 2019. The regular season was shortened from 72 games to 68 games; the league had a 72-game schedule since the 1975–76 season. The playoffs began on March 22, 2019 and ended on May 13; the winning team, the Prince Albert Raiders, were awarded the Ed Chynoweth Cup and a berth in the 2019 Memorial Cup, held at the Scotiabank Centre in Halifax, Nova Scotia, from May 17 to 26.

Standings
Updated to game(s) played on March 17.

Note: GP = Games played; W = Wins; L = Losses; OTL = Overtime losses; SL = Shootout losses; GF = Goals for; GA = Goals against; PTS = Points; x = clinched playoff berth; y = clinched division title; z = clinched conference title

Western Conference tiebreaker

Kamloops Blazers vs. Kelowna Rockets

Statistics

Scoring leaders 

Players are listed by points, then goals.

Note: GP = Games played; G = Goals; A = Assists; Pts. = Points; PIM = Penalty minutes

Goaltenders 
These are the goaltenders that lead the league in GAA that have played at least 1500 minutes.

Note: GP = Games played; Mins = Minutes played; W = Wins; L = Losses; OTL = Overtime losses; SOL = Shootout losses; SO = Shutouts; GAA = Goals against average; Sv% = Save percentage

2019 WHL playoffs

Conference Quarter-finals

Eastern Conference

(E1) Prince Albert Raiders vs. (W2) Red Deer Rebels

(E2) Saskatoon Blades vs. (E3) Moose Jaw Warriors

(C1) Edmonton Oil Kings vs. (W1) Medicine Hat Tigers

(C2) Lethbridge Hurricanes vs. (C3) Calgary Hitmen

Western Conference

(U1) Everett Silvertips vs. (W1) Tri-City Americans

(U2) Spokane Chiefs vs. (U3) Portland Winterhawks

(B1) Vancouver Giants vs. (W2) Seattle Thunderbirds

(B2) Victoria Royals vs. (B3) Kamloops Blazers

Conference Semi-finals

Eastern Conference

(E1) Prince Albert Raiders vs. (E2) Saskatoon Blades

(C1) Edmonton Oil Kings vs. (C3) Calgary Hitmen

Western Conference

(U1) Everett Silvertips vs. (U2) Spokane Chiefs

(B1) Vancouver Giants vs. (B2) Victoria Royals

Conference Finals

Eastern Conference

(E1) Prince Albert Raiders vs. (C1) Edmonton Oil Kings

Western Conference

(B1) Vancouver Giants vs. (U2) Spokane Chiefs

WHL Championship

(E1) Prince Albert Raiders vs. (B1) Vancouver Giants

Playoff scoring leaders
Note: GP = Games played; G = Goals; A = Assists; Pts = Points; PIM = Penalty minutes

Playoff leading goaltenders
Note: GP = Games played; Mins = Minutes played; W = Wins; L = Losses; GA = Goals Allowed; SO = Shutouts; SV& = Save percentage; GAA = Goals against average

WHL awards

All-Star Teams

Eastern Conference

Western Conference

See also 
 2019 Memorial Cup
 List of WHL seasons
 2018–19 OHL season
 2018–19 QMJHL season
 2018 in ice hockey
 2019 in ice hockey

References

External links 

 Official website of the Western Hockey League
 Official website of the Canadian Hockey League
 Official website of the MasterCard Memorial Cup
 Official website of the Subway Super Series

Western Hockey League seasons
Whl
WHL